Wind spirit, Spirit of the Wind, and its variants may refer to:

 Wind elemental
 Dogoda, mythological Slavic spirit of the west wind
 Gaoh, Algonquian for "Spirit of the Winds"
 Kajsa, Scandinavian for "wind spirit"
 Kamaitachi, Japanese for "wind spirit"
 Stribog (Stribozh, Strzybóg, Стрибог), in the Slavic pantheon, the god and spirit of the winds, sky, and air
 Tate (god), wind god/spirit in Lakota mythology

Works
 Spirit of the Wind, film
 Spirit of the Wind (novel)

Other
 Spirit-wind, another name for a Japanese kamikaze pilot
 Wind Spirit, motor sailing yacht
 Wind Spirit Air, United States airline (see Airline codes-W#Codes)

See also
 Ruach (Kabbalah), Hebrew for "wind" or "spirit"
 Wind (disambiguation)
 Spirit (disambiguation)